The Wold Newton Hoard is a coin hoard dating from the early 4th century AD. It contains 1,857 coins held within a pottery container. It was acquired by the Yorkshire Museum in 2016.

Discovery
The hoard was found by metal detectorist David Blakely on 21 September 2014 in a field near Wold Newton in the East Riding of Yorkshire.

Contents
The hoard contains 1,857 copper alloy coins all of which are nummi, except for a single radiate. The nummi all date from the period AD 294-307 and the radiate from AD 268–270. The coins were found within a grey-ware jar dating from the 4th Century. The coins and their container were found alongside a fragmentary dish and other fragments of pottery, one of which may have been used as a lid for the ceramic jar.

Significance
The Wold Newton Hoard is the largest Roman hoard of its type ever discovered in the north of England.

Acquisition and display
After being declared treasure, the hoard was valued at just over £44,200. The Yorkshire Museum ran a fundraising campaign (launched on 25 July 2016) to raise the money, which included donations from hundreds of people from around the world, £10,000 from the Arts Council/Victoria and Albert Museum Purchase Grant Fund and a donation of £9,981 from the American Friends of the Arts Fund. The hoard went on public display on 1 June 2017 in the Yorkshire Museum as part of the York Roman Festival.

References

External links
Video for the York Museums Trust fundraising campaign

2014 in England
2014 archaeological discoveries
Treasure troves in England
Treasure troves of Roman Britain
Archaeological sites in the East Riding of Yorkshire
Collections of the Yorkshire Museum
Hoards from Roman Britain
Coin hoards